Robin Leendert Coetzee is a South African rugby union player who currently plays for the Austin Gilgronis of Major League Rugby (MLR). His usual position is hooker.

Professional rugby career

He played in both legs of the ' promotion/relegation matches after the 2013 Super Rugby season, which saw the  regain their spot in Super Rugby.

He also represented them in Super Rugby in 2015 and 2016.

References

Living people
1989 births
South African rugby union players
Blue Bulls players
Golden Lions players
Lions (United Rugby Championship) players
Rugby union players from Pretoria
Rugby union hookers
Austin Gilgronis players